The 1745 Establishment was the third and final formal establishment of dimensions for ships to be built for the Royal Navy. It completely superseded the previous 1719 Establishment, which had subsequently been modified in 1733 and again in 1741 (but not formally replaced on either occasion). Although partially intended to correct the problems of the ships built to the earlier Establishments, the ships of the 1745 Establishment proved just as unsatisfactory, and important changes in the make-up of the Admiralty and Navy Boards finally led to the end of the establishment era by around 1751.

Origins
When the 1706 Establishment had come into effect, British naval architecture had been set on a path of conservatism that caused stagnation in the advance of shipbuilding in Great Britain.

With the end of Robert Walpole's government in 1742, the Board of Admiralty was re–organised, and the civilian Earl of Winchilsea was appointed First Lord.

The Duke of Bedford, again a civilian, was appointed First Lord in December 1744. He relied upon Rear-Admiral George Anson, who had refused promotion to flag rank under the previous First Lord. The fiasco that was the Battle of Toulon highlighted many of the problems in British shipbuilding, with several ships unable to open gunports due to a combination of a lack of stability and insufficient height of the ports above the waterline. It was observed by Commodore Charles Knowles that the British 70-gun ships were 'little superior to [the French] ships of 52 guns.' Many of the fleet's problems were blamed on Sir Jacob Acworth, the Surveyor of the Navy since 1715, and an unsuccessful attempt to remove him was mounted by one of the members of the Board of Admiralty, Henry Legge.

For the previous Establishments, the dimensions had been decided upon through consultation with the Surveyor and senior shipwrights; instead in June 1745 the Admiralty took the lead when it decided to deal with the problem of ship sizes, and set up a committee to review proposals made by the Navy Board. The original purpose of the Establishments was to standardise the fleet, but because ships had been built and rebuilt at various times to varying established dimensions, there was little more standardisation than had been present before the 1706 Establishment came into being. The new Establishment of 1745 was intended to correct this situation, and at the same time solve the issues with British ships that had been the cause of complaint by sea officers for several years.

The Admiralty had intended that the 80-gun ships should no longer be built, as they lacked maneuverability and stability, and their lower gunports were so close to the waterline that they could not be opened in anything above a calm sea. The committee the Admiralty had set up disagreed with their assessment however, and a suggestion to switch to 74-gun ships in lieu of the 80s was rejected. The size of ships was to be limited according to the depth of water available in the country's ports, and so even the 90-gun ships were to remain smaller than some French and Spanish 74s. Despite these setbacks, the Admiralty had achieved much greater increases in the sizes of ships than with the previous establishments. Furthermore, the ship types of pre-1741 were restored, with the 64-gun vessel returned to 70 guns, and the 58-gun vessels to 60.

Earlier establishments had merely laid out the principal dimensions for each type of warship from the 100-gun first rates down to the 20-gun sixth rates, although with effect from the 1719 Establishment this was augmented by defining the sizes and thicknesses of wood to be used in the construction. These establishments had left the actual design of each vessel to the Master Shipwright in each Naval Dockyard, with the Surveyor of the Navy responsible only for common designs for those ships built by contract by mercantile shipbuilders. However, under the new 1745 Establishment the responsibility for preparing designs ("draughts") for all ships was given to the Surveyor of the Navy, with the Master Shipwrights now responsible only for constructing ships to those common Surveyor's designs for each vessel type.

Additionally, control over the Establishments was passed from the Admiralty to the Privy Council, a move intended to remove the possibility of ongoing change. Despite the rejection of their proposal that 74-gun ships should replace 80s in the new Establishment, Admiralty did succeed in having , which was building as an 80, modified to be completed as a 74, though she was never considered a particularly successful ship, and was the smallest 74-gun ship of the 18th century.

Individual ship types
A different set of Establishment dimensions was defined for each size of ship, other than the smallest (i.e. the unrated) vessels. In the main (the exceptions being the 64-gun and 58-gun ships, as shown below) the armament remained that set out under the 1743 Establishment of Guns (created by Order of the King in Council, 25 April 1743); this was applied retrospectively to all ships order to be built subsequent to 1 January 1740.

First rates of 100 guns

As provided for under the 1743 Establishment of Guns, the 100-gun first rate was to carry an armament of:
 twenty-eight 42-pounder guns on its lower deck,
 twenty-eight 24-pounder guns on its middle deck,
 twenty-eight 12-pounder guns on its upper deck,
 twelve 6-pounder guns on its quarter deck, and
 four 6-pounder guns on its forecastle.

Second rates of 90 guns

As provided for under the 1743 Establishment of Guns, the 90-gun second rate was to carry an armament of:
 twenty-six 32-pounder guns on its lower deck,
 twenty-six 18-pounder guns on its middle deck,
 twenty-six 12-pounder guns on its upper deck,
 ten 6-pounder guns on its quarter deck, and
 two 6-pounder guns on its forecastle.

Third rates of 80 guns

As provided for under the 1743 Establishment of Guns, the 80-gun third rate was to carry an armament of:
 twenty-six 32-pounder guns on its lower deck,
 twenty-six 18-pounder guns on its middle deck,
 twenty-four 9-pounder guns on its upper deck,
 four 6-pounder guns on its quarter deck, and
 nil guns on its forecastle.

Third rates of 70 guns

The 1743 Establishment of Guns had provided for the former 70-gun third rate to be reduced from 70-gun to 64-gun ships, each with an armament of:
 twenty-six 32-pounder guns on its lower deck,
 twenty-six 18-pounder guns on its upper deck,
 ten 9-pounder guns on its quarter deck, and
 two 9-pounder guns on its forecastle.

Under the 1745 Establishment they were restored to 70 guns and were to carry an armament of:
 twenty-six 32-pounder guns on its lower deck,
 twenty-eight 18-pounder guns on its upper deck,
 twelve 9-pounder guns on its quarter deck, and
 four 9-pounder guns on its forecastle.

Fourth rates of 60 guns

The 1743 Establishment of Guns had provided for the former 60-gun third rate to be reduced from 60-gun to 58-gun ships, each with an armament of:
 twenty-four 24-pounder guns on its lower deck,
 twenty-four 12-pounder guns on its upper deck,
 eight 6-pounder guns on its quarter deck, and
 two 6-pounder guns on its forecastle.

Under the 1745 Establishment they were restored to 60 guns and were to carry an armament of:
 twenty-four 24-pounder guns on its lower deck,
 twenty-six 12-pounder guns on its upper deck,
 eight 6-pounder guns on its quarter deck, and
 two 6-pounder guns on its forecastle.

Fourth rates of 50 guns

As provided for under the 1743 Establishment of Guns, the 50-gun fourth rate was to carry an armament of:
 twenty-two 24-pounder guns on its lower deck,
 twenty-two 12-pounder guns on its upper deck,
 four 6-pounder guns on its quarter deck, and
 two 6-pounder guns on its forecastle.

Fifth rates (44-gun)

As provided for under the 1743 Establishment of Guns, the 44-gun fifth rate was to carry an armament of:
 twenty 18-pounder guns on its lower deck,
 twenty 9-pounder guns on its upper deck,
 four 6-pounder guns on its quarter deck, and
 nil guns on its forecastle.

Sixth rates (20-gun or 24-gun)

As provided for under the 1743 Establishment of Guns, the 24-gun sixth rate was to carry an armament of:
 two 9-pounder guns on its lower deck (aft),
 twenty 9-pounder guns on its upper deck,
 two 3-pounder guns on its quarter deck, and
 nil guns on its forecastle.

Amendments to the 1745 Establishment
When the first of the new ships began entering service, it became apparent that they were not so successful a design as had been hoped. Captains complained of their poor sailing qualities, and so the Admiralty sought permission from the Privy Council to make amendments to the designs in 1750. The changes agreed mainly affected the 90, 80 and 60-gun ships, although changes were made to the draughts of all sizes of ships.

By 1752, it was felt necessary to petition the Council for further alterations to be made to the designs, and again in 1754. On this occasion, the Admiralty decided to omit certain details—namely a  increase in the length of the 70-gun ships—from their proposals, so as to better the chances of their being accepted. However, by this time it was clear that the ships of the 1745 Establishment were a thorough disappointment.

End of an era
In 1755 Joseph Allin retired from his post as Surveyor of the Navy on ill health. He had been joint Surveyor with Jacob Ackworth until Ackworth's death in 1749, and sole Surveyor thereafter. Although nominally ordered as 70s, these new third rates were in fact the first of the  74s, and represented the end of the 70-gunner as a ship type on the navy lists. The era of crippling conservatism in British shipbuilding completed its slow death when Anson, by now the First Lord of the Admiralty, had the Navy Board reorganised with people who would support the Admiralty rather than fight with it, as had been the case previously.

Notes

References

Lavery, Brian (2003) The Ship of the Line - Volume 1: The development of the battlefleet 1650–1850. Conway Maritime Press. .
Winfield, Rif (2007) British Warships in the Age of Sail 1714–1792: Design, Construction, Careers and Fates. (One of a series dealing with British sailing warships; other volumes in the series cover 1603–1714 and 1793–1817) Seaforth Publishing. .

History of the Royal Navy
1745 in military history
1745 in Great Britain